Cullimore is a surname. Notable people with the surname include:

Allan Cullimore, the President of New Jersey Institute of Technology from 1920 to 1947
Ian H. S. Cullimore, English-born mathematician and computer scientist
James A. Cullimore (1906–1986), a general authority of The Church of Jesus Christ of Latter-day Saints
Jassen Cullimore (born 1972), Canadian professional ice hockey defenceman
Martin Cullimore (1908–1996), English cricketer
Michael Cullimore (1936–2021), British painter
Séamus Cullimore (born 1954), former Fianna Fáil politician from County Wexford in Ireland
Stan Cullimore (born 1962), played guitar for the Hull-based indie rock band called The Housemartins

See also 
Cullimore's Quarry, geological Site of Special Scientific Interest near the village of Charfield, South Gloucestershire
William J. and Lizzie Cullimore House, historic site in Orem, Utah, United States